Alfred Francis Grenda (September 15, 1889 – May 30, 1977) was an Australian professional track cyclist, who specialized in six-day races. He won eight in his career, including the Six Days of New York four times. He also competed in sprinting, notably winning the silver medal at the 1912 UCI Track Cycling World Championships. He came to the United States under a professional contract in 1912, where he stayed and became a naturalized citizen in 1930.

Major results
1912
 2nd  Sprint, UCI Track World Championships
1913
 1st Six Days of Toronto (with Ernie Pye)
1914
 1st Six Days of New York (with Alf Goullet)
1915
 1st Six Days of New York (with Alfred Hill)
 1st Six Days of Boston (with Alfred Hill)
1916
 1st Six Days of Boston (with Alf Goullet)
1922
 1st Six Days of New York (with Reginald McNamara)
1923
 1st Six Days of New York (with Alf Goullet)
1924
 1st Six Days of Chicago (with Oscar Egg)

References

External links

1889 births
1977 deaths
Sportspeople from Launceston, Tasmania
Australian male cyclists
American male cyclists
American track cyclists
Cyclists from Tasmania